Albert (c. 1338 – 1 April 1412) was King of Sweden from 1364 to 1389 and Duke of Mecklenburg-Schwerin from 1384 to 1412.

Background
He was the second son of Duke Albert II of Mecklenburg and Euphemia Eriksdotter, the daughter of Duke Erik Magnusson of Södermanland and sister of King Magnus IV of Sweden, Magnus VII of Norway. Albert married Richardis of Schwerin, daughter of count Otto of Schwerin. Queen Richardis died in 1377 and was buried in Stockholm.

In 1384 he inherited the ducal title of Mecklenburg and united it with Sweden in a personal union. Albert based his claims to the Swedish crown upon his family ties: his mother being Magnus's sister, whose paternal grandfather was King Magnus III, Albert claimed first place in the Swedish order of succession after the dethronement or deaths of all of the children of Magnus IV; and through a Swedish princess Christina, a daughter of Sverker II who was King of Sweden from 1196 to 1208.

Reign

In 1363, members of the Swedish Council of Aristocracy, led by Bo Jonsson Grip, arrived at the court of Mecklenburg. They had been banished from Sweden after a revolt against king Magnus IV who was unpopular with the nobility. At the nobles' request, Albert launched an invasion of Sweden supported by several German dukes and counts and several Hanseatic cities in Northern Germany. Stockholm and Kalmar in Sweden, with large Hanseatic populations, also welcomed the intervention.

Albert was proclaimed King of Sweden and officially crowned on 18 February 1364. The coronation took place at the Stones of Mora.  A fragment still remains of the stone commemorating the occasion called the Three Crowns stone. This is the earliest known example of the use of the three crowns as a national symbol for Sweden.

The arrival of Albert led to eight years of civil war in Sweden between Albert's and Magnus's supporters. In a battle near Enköping in 1365 between Albert's German forces and those of King Magnus, supported by king Haakon VI of Norway, Magnus's surviving son, Magnus was defeated and taken prisoner by Albert. After the initial defeat, King Valdemar IV of Denmark, Haakon's father-in-law, intervened on Magnus's and Haakon's behalf, and Valdemar's forces were joined by Swedish peasants who supported Magnus. Apart from German strongholds like Stockholm, Albert was unpopular among Swedes who were discontent with Albert's policy of appointing Germans as officials in all the Swedish provinces.

With the help of Danish and Swedish allies, King Haakon managed to temporarily beat back Albert and lay siege on Stockholm in 1371. However, the siege was short-lived; with military help from the Swedish nobility in Stockholm, Albert was able beat back the Norwegians and the Danes. A peace agreement was signed, with the condition that Magnus be released and allowed to travel freely back to Norway (where he had also been king until 1355 and now spent the rest of his life). Albert had secured the Swedish crown, but was also forced to make a belated coronation oath in which he agreed to extensive concessions to the Swedish nobility in the regency council. Bo Jonsson (Grip) used this power to personally usurp 1,500 farms and he soon became Sweden's largest landowner, controlling a third of the entirety of the Swedish territory and possessing the largest non-royal wealth in the country.

Deposition

Albert kept the crown of Sweden for another 19 years, but most of western Sweden did not support his reign. When he attempted to introduce reduction of the large estates of the Swedish nobility, he lost his support in Stockholm. In 1389, facing a loss of landholdings and wealth, the Swedish regency council turned to Haakon's widow Margaret to plead for help in getting rid of Albert. Queen Margaret sent troops and in February 1389, they defeated Albert at the Battle of Åsle. Albert was captured, deposed and sent to Lindholmen Castle in Scania, where he spent the next six years imprisoned. He was released after 16 days of peace negotiations in 1395, during which he agreed to either give up Stockholm within three years, or pay large sums in retribution to Margaret. When the three years were up, Albert's (then) only son Eric had died after ruling Gotland in Sweden for a short time as instigated by his father, and Albert chose to give up Stockholm rather than pay the fine. In 1398 the agreement came into force, granting Margaret possession of Stockholm.

Albert returned to Mecklenburg, remarried, had another son and reigned as Duke of Mecklenburg-Schwerin until his death, seven months before Margaret's in 1412. He had finally formally abdicated his Swedish throne in 1405, but until then still styled himself King of Sweden and his second wife Queen Agnes. His tomb is in the Doberan Minster in Bad Doberan, Germany.

Marriages and children
In 1359 Albert married Richardis of Schwerin  in a marriage contracted in Wismar on 12 October 1352. The King and Queen had two children:

Eric (died 1397), Swedish crown prince and ruler of Gothland
Richardis Catherine (died 1400), married in Prague in 1388 to Emperor Charles IV's fifth son John of Bohemia (1370–1396), Margrave of Moravia and Duke of Görlitz (Lusatia).

In February 1396 in Schwerin Albert married Agnes of Brunswick-Lüneburg (died 1430/1434). They had a son:

Albert V of Mecklenburg  (died 1423), Duke of Mecklenburg and Schwerin

Further reading
 
  A good overall German source describing Albert's life.

References

Bibliography

In English
Demitz, Jacob Truedson preface by Dr. Ulf Sundberg, Centuries of Selfies 2020  pp. 28-29, 110, 151-152, 169 & 191

In Swedish
 Nordberg, Michael I kung Magnus tid. (Stockholm: Norstedts, 1995) , in Swedish.
 Den svenska historien: Medeltid 1319–1520. (Stockholm: Bonniers, 1966) p. 74–83, in Swedish.
 Hagen, Ellen Margareta – Nordens drottning. (Stockholm: Saxon & Lindströms förlag, 1953), in Swedish.
 Larsson, Lars-Olof  Kalmarunionens tid. (Stockholm: Prisma, Andra upplagan 1997) , in Swedish.

External links

1338 births
1412 deaths
14th-century Swedish monarchs
Dukes of Mecklenburg-Schwerin
House of Mecklenburg-Schwerin
Swedish monarchs of German descent